"Sky Is Falling" is the debut single by British singer and songwriter Natalie Duncan. The single is taken from her debut album Devil in Me. The single was released on 30 March 2012.

Music video

A promotional video for the song was uploaded to YouTube in April 2012. The video features computer animation as well as live action shots of Natalie at the piano.

Track listings

Digital download

 "Sky Is Falling"  – 4:19 	
 "While You Wait for the Others"  – 4:59

References

External links
 Official web site

2011 songs
British soul songs
Verve Records singles